Donau-Ries is an electoral constituency (German: Wahlkreis) represented in the Bundestag. It elects one member via first-past-the-post voting. Under the current constituency numbering system, it is designated as constituency 254. It is located in western Bavaria, comprising the Dillingen district, Donau-Ries district, and the northern part of the Aichach-Friedberg district.

Donau-Ries was created for the inaugural 1949 federal election. Since 2009, it has been represented by Ulrich Lange of the Christian Social Union (CSU).

Geography
Donau-Ries is located in western Bavaria. As of the 2021 federal election, it comprises the districts of Dillingen and Donau-Ries as well as the municipality of Altenmünster from the Landkreis Augsburg district and the municipality of Inchenhofen and the Verwaltungsgemeinschaften of Aindling, Kühbach, and Pöttmes from the Aichach-Friedberg district.

History
Donau-Ries was created in 1949, then known as Donauwörth. It acquired its current name in the 1976 election. In the 1949 election, it was Bavaria constituency 44 in the numbering system. In the 1953 through 1961 elections, it was number 239. In the 1965 through 1998 elections, it was number 240. In the 2002 and 2005 elections, it was number 255. Since the 2009 election, it has been number 254.

Originally, the constituency comprised the independent cities of Neuburg an der Donau and Nördlingen and the districts of Donauwörth, Landkreis Neuburg an der Donau, and Landkreis Nördlingen. In the 1965 through 1972 elections, it also contained the independent city of Dillingen an der Donau and the Landkreis Dillingen district. In the 1976 through 1994 elections, it comprised the districts of Donau-Ries and Dillingen. In the 1998 election, it acquired the municipality of Inchenhofen and the Verwaltungsgemeinschaften of Kühbach and Pöttmes from the Aichach-Friedberg district. In the 2005 election, it further acquired the Verwaltungsgemeinschaft of Aindling. In the 2021 election, it acquired the municipality of Altenmünster from Landkreis Augsburg.

Members
The constituency has been held continuously by the Christian Social Union (CSU) since its creation. It was first represented by Martin Loibl from 1949 to 1953, followed by Philipp Meyer from 1953 to his death in 1962. Karl Heinz Lemmrich was representative from 1965 to 1990, a total of seven consecutive terms. Hans Raidel then served from 1990 to 2009. Ulrich Lange was elected in 2009, and re-elected in 2013, 2017, and 2021.

Election results

2021 election

2017 election

2013 election

2009 election

References

Federal electoral districts in Bavaria
1949 establishments in West Germany
Constituencies established in 1949
Dillingen (district)
Donau-Ries
Augsburg (district)
Aichach-Friedberg